Coherence is a 2013 American surreal science fiction psychological thriller film directed by James Ward Byrkit in his directorial debut. The film had its world debut on September 19, 2013, at Fantastic Fest and stars Emily Foxler as a woman who must deal with strange occurrences following the close passing of a comet.

Plot
On the night of Miller's Comet's passing, eight friends in Northern California reunite for a dinner party at the home of spouses Mike and Lee. One of the guests, Emily, hesitates over whether to accompany her boyfriend Kevin on an extended business trip to Vietnam.

To the party-goers' dismay, their friend Amir has brought Laurie along with him.
Laurie is Kevin's ex-girlfriend, who flirts inappropriately and wants Kevin back. 

During dinner, the conversation becomes strained by the animosity between Emily's close friend Beth and Laurie, compounded when Laurie antagonizes Emily by bringing up a ballet role she lost by waiting too long to decide.

As a power outage occurs, Mike and Lee bring candles and several boxes of different colored glow sticks to use for light. The friends each take a blue glow stick, then venture outside where they see the comet passing overhead. The entire neighborhood has gone dark except for one house that still has power. When they go back inside, they notice a broken glass no-one remembers damaging. Beth's husband Hugh and Amir decide to go to the lit-up house and ask to use their phone, as Hugh's brother insisted Hugh call him if "anything strange" were to happen.

When Hugh and Amir return, both have face wounds and are carrying a box which turns out to contain a ping-pong paddle and photographs of everyone, including one of Amir that could only have been taken that night, with numbers written on the backs. Hugh, deeply upset, reveals that he looked into the other house and saw a table set for a dinner party with eight places. The group realize the other house is an alternate version of the one they are in. Emily writes down the numbers from the box on a notepad, looking for a pattern, but cannot find one.

Hugh decides to write a note to leave at the other house, only for a man to approach the house and pin an exact copy of the note to their door before Hugh can go and place it on theirs. Emily, Kevin, Mike, and Laurie decide to go to the other house together, carrying the glow sticks for light. On the way there, they encounter a wandering group of exact doubles of them, carrying red glow sticks rather than blue, causing each group to flee back to their houses.

Hugh goes to his car to retrieve his physicist brother's book, which explains the concept of quantum decoherence. They speculate that the comet has created two split realities, one of which will collapse once the comet has passed. They surmise that an area of dense darkness outside in the darkened neighborhood will send anyone who passes through it to a different reality's house. They discuss how to deal with the other house. An agitated Mike drinks heavily and considers killing their doubles before the doubles can kill them. He eventually decides to blackmail the other house's Mike into staying away from the book via a note.

The group realizes that Hugh and Amir, in their midst, came from the other house. When the two take the box and leave, they soon return carrying blue glow sticks. They also explain that they found two notes at the other house, leading everyone to realize that the split created far more alternate realities than just two. Beth sees Laurie kissing Kevin in the hallway. Someone outside smashes Hugh's car window. Emily goes to her car to retrieve the ring Kevin gave her. Kevin approaches her and they talk, but Emily quickly realizes she is talking to Kevin from a different reality.

Emily returns to the others and they decide to create their own unique box to make sure they are all from the same reality. They recreate the box of photographs with numbers on the back (taken from die rolls) and include a randomly chosen object. After surveying the group, Emily finds that only Lee and Beth, both of whom stayed inside the house the entire time, originate from that house; that herself, Kevin and Laurie are from a different house; that Hugh and Amir are from a third reality after going out to make the phone call; and that Mike is from a fourth house after going out alone to attempt to blackmail himself. The situation deteriorates further when a note meant to blackmail Mike into keeping the others away from the book arrives, revealing an adulterous liaison between him and Beth. Another Mike breaks in and attempts to kill his double, terrifying the group.

Seeing Kevin comfort Laurie, Emily leaves the house. She looks into several alternate houses, finding many where the situation is even worse than the house she came from. She eventually comes across a house in which no one seems aware of the split and where this Emily is happy and secure in her relationship with Kevin. Emily smashes Hugh's car window to lure everyone out of the house, then ambushes this house's Emily and injects her with Beth's ketamine when she goes to get her ring out of her car. Emily takes her former self's place while Miller's Comet breaks apart overhead, but must subdue this house's Emily again when she crawls back into the house's bathroom. She steals the ring from her defeated self after losing her own in the altercation, then faints when returning to the living room.

Emily wakes the following day on the sofa, unable to find her double but with the rest of the party seeming none the wiser. Outside, she and Kevin talk lovingly and he gives her back her ring, which he had found lying on the bathroom floor. Kevin's cell phone rings and he notes that the call is curiously coming from Emily's number. Emily looks mutely down at the two rings she now possesses, and she and Kevin look expressionlessly at one another as he answers the phone.

Cast
 Emily Foxler as Em
 Maury Sterling as Kevin
 Nicholas Brendon as Mike
 Lorene Scafaria as Lee
 Hugo Armstrong as Hugh
 Elizabeth Gracen as Beth
 Alex Manugian as Amir
 Lauren Maher as Laurie
 Aqueela Zoll played one copy of Emily when there were two of them in one scene
 Kelly Donovan, the real-life identical twin brother of Nicholas Brendon, played one copy of Mike when there were two of them in one scene

Production

Development
Byrkit came up with the idea for Coherence after deciding that he wanted to test the idea of shooting a film "without a crew and without a script". He chose to shoot in his own home and developed the film's science fiction aspect out of necessity, as he wanted to "make a living room feel bigger than just a living room". While Byrkit did have a specific idea for how the film would unfold, he selected improvisational actors and gave them the basic outline of their characters, motivations, and major plot points.

Byrkit told an interviewer, "For about a year, all I did was make charts and maps and drew diagrams of houses, arrows pointing where everyone was going, trying to keep track of different iterations. Months and months of tracking fractured realities, looking up what actual scientists believe about the nature of reality—Schrödinger's cat and all that. It was research, but despite all the graphs and charts, I think our whole idea was that it has to be character-based. We want the logic of our internal rules to be sound, and we wanted it to be something people could watch 12 times and still discover a new layer."

The movie cuts to black at 0:02, 0:03, 0:05, 0:05, 0:07, 0:09, 0:19, 0:27, 0:32, 0:34, 1:06, 1:18, 1:22, and 1:23. The movie's director has said those cuts signify something but hasn't said what they signify. There was no cut to black around 0:16, which was the point of divergence between realities, although the house was plunged into darkness due to an electricity cut. There was no cut to black at 0:17 when the characters all switched from a house without a broken glass to a house with broken glass, and there was no cut to black at 0:46, when only Mike switched to a different reality.

Casting
Byrkit intentionally chose actors who did not know each other. He told an interviewer that, after working on blockbuster films (such as Pirates of the Caribbean: The Curse of the Black Pearl), "I come from the theater where I was trained to really just concentrate on story and character on a stage with actors and so I was craving getting rid of everything, getting rid of the crew; getting rid of the script, no special effects, no support, no money, no nothing, and just getting back to the purity of that, of a camera in your hand and some actress (actors?) that you trust and an idea."

Byrkit added, 

When asked whether the actors were people whom Byrkit knew pretty well, he answered, "Yeah exactly. They were just friends that I knew I could just call up and say, 'Show up at my house in a couple days. I can't really tell you what we're doing, trust me I'm not going to kill you. It should be fun!' And they didn't know each other before they got to my house and so I had to pick people that seemed to be like they could be couples, seemed like they could be best friends and that I just knew were up to the task of jumping into it."

Interviewer Nell Minow confessed her reaction to the actors' relationships: "I just assumed that they all knew each other very well because they fell into the kinds of rhythms that old friends have." Byrkit replied, "That's just casting great people that could do that. Just five minutes after they arrived at my house they had to pretend to be married and lovers and best friends."

Reviewer Matt Prigge praised the choice of casting and their actions: "Byrkit ... focuses not on brainiacs, as in Primer, but on smart but mostly under-informed NPR types, who know enough to slowly piece all this together but not enough that they don't usually descend into blabbering, shouting and drinking. Indeed, Coherence is largely improvised, with a game cast first believably under-reacting to some weird business with laughter and disbelief, then always maintaining a degree of levity (read: jokes and occasional put-downs) even when stuff has gotten real."

Writing
Ryan Lattanzio wrote, "Byrkit brought eight unwitting actors to his Santa Monica home, threw them a few red herrings and set them loose for five days knowing that the film could evolve organically, like great jazz, if he kept his players in the dark. But he and co-storywriter Alex Manugian weren't just making it up as they went along." Byrkit told him that his desire was "to strip down a film set to the bare minimum: getting rid of the script, getting rid of the crew."

Byrkit added, "... instead of a script I had my own 12-page treatment that I spent about a year working on. It outlined all of the twists and reveals, and character arcs and pieces of the puzzle that needed to happen scene-by-scene. But each day, instead of getting a script, the actors would get a page of notes for their individual character, whether it was a backstory or information about their motivations. They would come prepared for their character only. They had no idea what the other characters received, so each night there were completely real reactions, and surprises and responses. This was all in the pursuit of naturalistic performances. The goal was to get them listening to each other, and engaged in the mystery of it all."

Nicholas Brendon, an actor in the film, discussed the improvisational style of the dialogue with Mandatory journalist Fred Topel, who asked: "I understand the way Coherence was done was that everyone got notecards about their characters and the scenes. What was on your notecards?" Brendon replied, "I can't remember now, but every day we had five different things that we had to convey... but I do know that Jim [Byrkit], and then Alex [Manugian], the other writer, had to make sure that we were all on point. So it was just a matter of getting that information out. ... Since there was no script, I had no idea how it ended. ... When I saw the movie, I'm like, 'Oh shit, this is awesome!' ...  To be quite honest with you, I never really knew what was going on fully until I saw the movie done."

Filming
Principal photography took place over the course of five nights in Byrkit's house.

An interviewer asked Byrkit, "Did you run into any unexpected problems in filming?" Byrkit admitted, "... you're constantly dealing with unexpected things. One night we tried to shoot outside and we had to make the whole thing look completely desolate and the power being off; that was the one night that we had another movie shooting on our street. So the whole street is completely ablaze with lights and hundreds of extras." Another team was shooting a Snickers commercial. "We would be right in the middle of the dramatic scenes and there would be another knock on the door that would just scare the hell out of everybody ..."

Music 
The original score was composed by Kristin Øhrn Dyrud. The song in the closing credits is "Galaxies", from the album Year of Meteors by Laura Veirs.

Inspirations and themes
Byrkit told an interviewer for Spinning Platters, "Well, we came up with the premise in my living room, where the movie is shot. A couple of years ago we were trying to think about what a good low budget, or no budget, movie would be. And, since we didn't have any resources, I had to think of what we actually had.  We had a camera.  We had some actors who were pretty good, and we had a living room. So we had to find out how to make a living room feel like more than just a living room. And, that led to a whole Twilight Zone type story ... I was craving a more naturalistic type of dialogue, where people overlap and it's very messy, where people talk more like real humans talk.  And so, we planned the story for a year, including the twists and turns and reversals and betrayals so that we had a really tight puzzle – almost like a funhouse that we knew we could lead the actors through."

Some reviewers have suggested that Byrkit was influenced by the eeriness of The Twilight Zone and/or the mind-challenging complexities of the science fiction film Primer.

Byrkit answered one interviewer: "Twilight Zone, for sure. Primer wasn't really an influence so much as it was a sign to us that maybe there was an audience for this kind of movie. The actual movie itself is so different than ours that it wasn't as much of an influence as, say, Carnage by Roman Polanski, or other non-sci-fi movies."

Reception
On Rotten Tomatoes, the film has a rating of 88% based on 91 reviews. The site consensus says "A case study in less-is-more filmmaking, Coherence serves as a compelling low-budget calling card for debuting writer-director James Ward Byrkit." On Metacritic it has a score of 65% based on reviews from 23 critics, indicating "generally favorable reviews".

Much of the film's praise centered upon its cast, which Bloody Disgusting and Fangoria cited as a highlight. Film School Rejects gave Coherence a positive review, stating that the film's cast was "remarkably grounded for how complicated and bizarre the story is."

Dread Central commented on the film's themes and wrote, "What's frightening about the story is how willing the characters are to abandon the reality they know in favor of one that may be a little more appealing. Whether that's a byproduct of the comet and the rift it creates or caused by the characters undermining everyone else around them to get the life they really want is the fundamental idea of Coherence and what makes it so unsettling."

Clark Collis of Entertainment Weekly praised the film, granting it a B+ rating: "In an impressive big-screen debut from James Ward Byrkit, eight friends discover metaphysics on their menu when a passing comet creates a set of doppelgängers down the road, enjoying their own identical soiree. Byrkit makes the most of the claustrophobic one-house setting, ratcheting up the dread and paranoia as his characters make a string of seemingly reasonable but ultimately wrongheaded decisions. The star-free cast is great too, with Buffy the Vampire Slayer vet Nicholas Brendon poking fun at himself by playing an actor who used to be on a TV show ... Coherence is a satisfying and chilling addition to the ever-growing pal-ocalypse subgenre. And really, you have to love a film that not only explains the concept of Schrödinger's cat but also includes a joke about it ("I'm allergic!").

Stephen Dalton of The Hollywood Reporter also enjoyed the film: "An ingenious micro-budget science-fiction nerve-jangler which takes place entirely at a suburban dinner party, Coherence is a testament to the power of smart ideas and strong ensemble acting over expensive visual pyrotechnics ... A group of eight friends gather for dinner ... Marital tensions and sexual secrets sizzle just below the surface, but relationship drama is soon overshadowed by metaphysical weirdness when a comet passes close to Earth, shutting down power supplies and phone connections ... It slowly becomes clear that the fabric of reality has been radically remixed by the comet's arrival. We are definitely not in Kansas any more ... Byrkit only gave his cast limited information about the narrative loops and swerves ahead, encouraging a semi-improvised naturalism that feels authentically tense."

Matt Zoller Seitz, editor-in-chief of Roger Ebert's website, gives the movie three stars and writes that the film "is proof that inventive filmmakers can do a lot with a little ... [but] none of the movie's technical or artistic shortcomings prove to be deal-breakers. Once Coherence delves into its premise, the viewer is bound to come down with a bad case of the creeps. This is a less-is-more science fiction-horror tale ... And it's genuinely more of a horror film than a suspense or "terror" film because, while there's some violence, the source of unease is philosophical."

Ryan Lattanzio of Indiewire praised the film's originality: "Coherence is not just smart science fiction: it's a triumph of crafty independent filmmaking, made with few resources and big ambition. Gotham-nominated debut director James Ward Byrkit stripped his vision down to the barest of bones to achieve a mind-shifting, metaphysical freakout about a dinner party gone cosmically awry. This film explodes with ideas, and it has that thing we always hope for at the movies: the element of surprise."

The reviewer for Salon was ambivalent: "After the fundamental problem of Coherence has become clear, or clear-ish – there's another dinner party, at that other house, that looks an awful lot like this one – the movie becomes slightly too much like an unfolding mathematical puzzle, although an ingenious one that reaches a chilling conclusion. Notes appear before they are written, the significance of those numbered photographs comes into focus through a series of neat twists, and while the characters are half-aware that their actions are being shaped by a space-time continuum whose cause-and-effect relationship has gone awry, that's not enough to stop them."

Accolades
 Next Wave Best Screenplay at the Austin Fantastic Fest (2013, won)
 Maria Award for Best Screenplay at the Sitges Film Festival (2013, won)
 Carnet Jove Jury Award for best In Competition at the Sitges Film Festival (2013, won)
 Black Tulip Award for Best Feature Debut at the Imagine Film Festival (2014, won)
 Imagine Movie Zone Award, Special Mention at the Imagine Film Festival (2014, won)

See also
 Many-minds interpretation
 Many-worlds interpretation
 Multiverse
 Everything Everywhere All at Once
 "The Garden of Forking Paths", a 1941 short story by Argentine writer and poet Jorge Luis Borges

References

External links
 
 
 

2013 films
2013 independent films
2010s science fiction thriller films
American independent films
American science fiction thriller films
Comets in film
Films about parallel universes
Films set in California
Improvised films
Time loop films
2013 directorial debut films
2010s English-language films
2010s American films